Damien Alamos (born July 30, 1990) is a French Muay Thai kickboxer. He is the WPMF European and World Muaythai Champion & Lumpinee stadium champion 140 lb. For his professional fighting career he is jointly managed by Numnoi and Rodrigo Alamos. He is a member of Singpatong Sitnumnoi and Impacts Bordeaux Clubs.

Biography and career
At Lumpinee Stadium, Alamos became WPMF World Champion winning his bout against Iranian Abat Muaythaiacademy. He had a recent bout with Orono Wor Petchpun (World Champion, Lumpinee Champion, Thailand Champion, It's Showtime Champion), in which he was unsuccessful although he has plenty to offer in the future as one of France's rising stars in Muaythai.

He became the first non-Thai to defend a Lumpinee title in September 2012.

He was scheduled to rematch Houcine Bennoui at Time Fight 2 in Tours, France on October 6, 2012 but the fight was cancelled in order for Alamos to face Diesellek Aoodonmuang at Lumpinee on October 12, 2012. He lost to Diesellek via decision in a non-title fight.

He lost a decision to the legendary Saenchai PKSaenchaimuaythaigym at Best of Siam 2 in Paris on November 22, 2012.

Alamos rematched Lampard Sor. Khamsing in southern Thailand on February 8, 2013 and won with a second round high kick KO.

He lost to Thongchai Sitthongsak via TKO at Lumpinee on March 8, 2013 in a non-title fight.

He defeated Kongbeng Mor Ratanabandit by unanimous decision to win the WMC World Lightweight title (-135 lb) at Bangla Stadium on April 28, 2013.

Alamos rematched Singsuriya Mor.Ratanabandit at Lumpinee on July 16, 2013 and won by KO in round two to make the second defence of his lightweight title.

Alamos won the -65 kg/143 lb Thai Max tournament in Meyreul, France on October 19, 2013, defeating Crice Boussoukou and Tim Thomas by unanimous decision in the quarter-finals and semi-finals, respectively, before beating Houcine Bennoui by TKO due to a cut in the final.

He was set fight Liam Harrison at Yokkao 8 in Bolton, England on March 8, 2014 but withdrew from the fight, claiming to have a hand injury, and was replaced by Houcine Bennoui.

In 2014 Damien Alamos has retired from the rings. Residing in Thailand he converted to Islam.

On August 28, 2020, Alamos returned from retirement and signed up with ARENA FIGHT Championship to fight at AFC2 on December 12.

Titles and accomplishments

Professional:
2013 THAI MAX Tournament champion
2013 WMC World Muaythai title (135 lbs)
2012 Lumpinee Stadium Super Lightweight Champion 140 lbs (1st title defence)
2012 W.P.M.F. World Muaythai Champion 63.500 kg (2nd title defence)
2012 Lumpinee Stadium Super Lightweight Champion 140 lbs
2011 W.P.M.F. World Muaythai Champion 63.500 kg (1st title defence)
2010 W.P.M.F. European Muaythai Champion 63.500 kg
2010 W.P.M.F. World Muaythai Champion 63.500 kg
2009 FFSCDA French Muay Thai Class A Champion (63.500 kg)

Muay Thai record

|-  style="background:#cfc;"
| 2014-01-04 || Win ||align=left| Daoprakai Nor.Sripueng ||  Suk Singpatong + Sit Numnoi  || Phuket, Thailand || KO (Right Highkick) || 2 ||
|-  style="background:#cfc;"
| 2013-10-19 || Win ||align=left| Houcine Bennoui || THAI MAX Tournament, Final || Meyreuil, France || TKO (cut) || 2 || 
|-
! style=background:white colspan=9 |
|-  style="background:#cfc;"
| 2013-10-19 || Win ||align=left| Tim Thomas || THAI MAX Tournament, Semi Final   || Meyreuil, France || Decision (unanimous) || 3 || 3:00
|-  style="background:#cfc;"
| 2013-10-19 || Win ||align=left| Crice Boussoukou || THAI MAX Tournament, Quarter Final   || Meyreuil, France || Decision (unanimous) || 3 || 3:00
|-  style="background:#cfc;"
| 2013-09-06 || Win ||align=left| Farmongkon Sor Jor Danrayong ||  Lumpinee Stadium  || Bangkok, Thailand || Decision || 5 || 3:00
|-  style="background:#cfc;"
| 2013-07-16 || Win ||align=left| Singsuriya Mor Ratanabandit || Lumpinee Stadium || Bangkok, Thailand || KO (Left Hook) || 2 || 
|-
! style=background:white colspan=9 |
|-  style="background:#cfc;"
| 2013-05-17 || Win ||align=left| Singsuriya Mor Ratanabandit || Impacts Fight Night 3: Premium series || Bordeaux, France || Decision || 5 || 3:00
|-  style="background:#cfc;"
| 2013-04-28 || Win ||align=left| Kongbeng Mor Ratanabandit ||  Bangla Stadium 9th Birthday  || Phuket, Thailand || Decision (unanimous) || 5 || 3:00
|-
! style=background:white colspan=9 |
|-  style="background:#fbb;"
| 2013-03-08 || Loss ||align=left| Thongchai Sitsongpeenong || Lumpinee Stadium || Bangkok, Thailand || TKO (elbow) || 2 || 
|-  style="background:#cfc;"
| 2013-02-08 || Win ||align=left| Lampard Sor. Khamsing || Muaythai Gala || Thailand || KO (high kick) || 2 || 
|-  style="background:#cfc;"
| 2013-01-04 || Win ||align=left| Lamtong Tor.Ponchai ||  Bangla Stadium || Phuket, Thailand || Decision || 5 || 3:00
|-  style="background:#cfc;"
| 2012-12-02 || Win ||align=left| Saksongkram Poptheeratum || Muaythai Gala  || Songkhla, Thailand || TKO (cut) || 2 || 
|-  style="background:#fbb;"
| 2012-11-22 ||Loss ||align=left| Saenchai PKSaenchaimuaythaigym || Best of Siam 2 || Paris, France || Decision || 5 || 3:00
|-  style="background:#fbb;"
| 2012-10-12 || Loss ||align=left| Diesellek Aoodonmuang || Lumpinee Stadium || Bangkok, Thailand || Decision || 5 || 3:00
|-  style="background:#cfc;"
| 2012-09-07 || Win ||align=left| Aranchai Pran 26 || Lumpinee Champion Krikkrai Fight || Bangkok, Thailand || Decision || 5 || 3:00
|-
! style=background:white colspan=9 |
|-  style="background:#cfc;"
| 2012-08-11 || Win ||align=left| Tanachai Chor.Pradit || Muaythai Gala || Phattalung, Thailand || KO (Highkick) || 2 || 
|-  style="background:#cfc;"
| 2012-07-21 || Win ||align=left| Lampard Sor Khamsing ||Impacts Fights Night: Bangkok sur bassin || Bordeaux, France || Decision || 5 || 3:00
|-  style="background:#cfc;"
| 2012-06-01 || Win ||align=left| Alessio D'Angelo ||Impacts Fights Night || Bordeaux, France || Decision || 5 || 3:00
|-  style="background:#cfc;"
| 2012-04-30 || Win ||align=left| Chok Eminentair || Muaythai Gala - WPMF Championship || Surat Thani, Thailand || Decision || 5 || 3:00
|-
! style=background:white colspan=9 |
|-  style="background:#fbb;"
| 2012-03-30 || Loss ||align=left| Chok Eminentair || Muaythai Gala || Thailand || Decision || 5 || 3:00
|-  style="background:#cfc;"
| 2012-02-10 || Win ||align=left| Kongfah Uddonmuang || Kiatpet promotions, Lumpinee Stadium || Bangkok, Thailand || Decision || 5 || 3:00
|-
! style=background:white colspan=9 |
|-  style="background:#cfc;"
| 2012-01-18 || Win ||align=left| Phet Sa Nguan || Muaythai Gala in Phuket || Phuket, Thailand || KO (Left Hook) || 3 || 
|-  style="background:#cfc;"
| 2011-10-23 || Win ||align=left| Fahmonkon Kor Chaiprayom || Gala Suk Kiatpech - Bangla Stadium || Phuket, Thailand || KO (Left Highkick) || 1 || 
|-  style="background:#cfc;"
| 2011-09-23 || Win ||align=left| Diesellek Aoodonmuang || Kiatphet Fight, Lumpinee Stadium || Bangkok, Thailand || Decision || 5 || 3:00
|-
! style=background:white colspan=9 |
|-  style="background:#cfc;"
| 2011-07-12 || Win ||align=left| Seemanut Sor. Sarinya || Gala Suk Kiatpech || Phatthalung Province || Decision || 5 || 3:00
|-  style="background:#cfc;"
| 2011-04-14 || Win ||align=left| Dejsuriya Pumphanmuang || Siam Omnoi Stadium || Bangkok, Thailand || KO (Highkick) || 4 || 
|-  style="background:#cfc;"
| 2011-03-06 || Win ||align=left| Apisak K.T Gym || TV7 Stadium || Bangkok, Thailand || Decision || 5 || 3:00
|-  style="background:#fbb;"
| 2010-11-26 || Loss ||align=left| Sitthichai Sitsongpeenong || La Nuit des Champions 2010 || Marseilles, France || Decision || 5 || 3:00
|-
! style=background:white colspan=9 |
|-  style="background:#fbb;"
| 2010-08-20 || Loss ||align=left| Pongsaklek Sitmorlambat || Eminentair Fight, Lumpinee Stadium || Bangkok, Thailand || Decision || 5 || 3:00
|-  style="background:#cfc;"
| 2010-04-24 || Win ||align=left| Niko Barbera Rocamora || Fight Night 1 || Bordeaux, France || Decision || 5 || 3:00
|-
! style=background:white colspan=9 |
|-  style="background:#fbb;"
| 2010-04-10 || Loss ||align=left| Orono Wor Petchpun || Sherdana K-1 Gala || Sardinia, Italy || KO (Left elbow)|| 2 || 
|-  style="background:#cfc;"
| 2010-02-26 || Win ||align=left| Abass Ahmadi || Kiatphet Fight, Lumpinee Stadium || Bangkok, Thailand || Decision || 5 || 3:00
|-
! style=background:white colspan=9 |
|-  style="background:#cfc;"
| 2009-12-04 || Win ||align=left| Petchbangpung Sakchatri || Kings Birthday || Bangkok, Thailand || KO || 3 || 
|-  style="background:#cfc;"
| 2009-11-14 || Win ||align=left| Thomas Adamandopoulos || La Nuit des Champions 2009 || Marseille, France || Decision || 5 || 3:00
|-
! style=background:white colspan=9 |
|-  style="background:#cfc;"
| 2009-10-24 || Win ||align=left| Tantawan Windysport || Phumpanmoung Fight, Lumpinee Stadium || Bangkok, Thailand || Decision  || 5 || 3:00
|-  style="background:#cfc;"
| 2009-09-19 || Win ||align=left| Ronnachai Sitpandiang || Kiatpet Fight, Lumpinee Stadium || Bangkok, Thailand || TKO || 2 || 
|-  style="background:#cfc;"
| 2009-08-11 || Win ||align=left| Kim Sung Yong || Queens Birthday || Thailand || KO || 2 || 
|-  style="background:#c5d2ea;"
| 2009-06-22 || Draw ||align=left| Salem Messous || Muaythai Gala in Levallois || Levallois, France || Decision Draw || 5 || 3:00
|-  style="background:#fbb;"
| 2009-05-16 || Loss ||align=left| Houcine Bennoui || Légendes et Guerriers || Toulouse, France || Decision || 3 || 3:00
|-  style="background:#cfc;"
| 2009-04-11 || Win ||align=left| Moha Stitou || Impacts Muaythai & Pancrase Gala || Bordeaux, France || TKO || 1 || 
|-  style="background:#fbb;"
| 2009-03-17 || Loss ||align=left| Kingstar Saenpalungchai || Siangmorakot Fights, Lumpinee Stadium || Bangkok, Thailand || Decision || 5 || 3:00
|-  style="background:#cfc;"
| 2009-02-07 || Win ||align=left| Brahim Yakoun || International Muaythai Gala || Saumur, France || TKO || 1 || 
|-  style="background:#cfc;"
| 2009-01-10 || Win ||align=left| Nordine Bekhtaoui || French Championships FMDA Class B, 1st Round || Paris, France || KO || 1 || 
|-  style="background:#cfc;"
| 2008-12-06 || Win ||align=left| Youri Kim || Palais des sports de Beaulieu || Nantes, France || TKO (Gave Up) || 4 || 
|-  style="background:#cfc;"
| 2008-11-08 || Win ||align=left| Alberto Lazaro || Kickboxing & Muaythai Gala || Pamplona, Spain || KO (Elbow) || 1 || 
|-  style="background:#cfc;"
| 2008-04-26 || Win ||align=left| Aziz Alikada || Muaythai Gala, Class B Fight || Pau, France || KO (Knee) || 3 || 
|-  style="background:#cfc;"
| 2008-02-02 || Win ||align=left| Corentin Lievens || Gala de Saumur || Saumur, France || KO (Knee to the liver) ||  || 
|-  style="background:#cfc;"
| 2006-12-16 || Win ||align=left| Gomez Barbosa || Impacts Aquitaine Gala, Exhibition Match || France || Decision ||  || 
|-  style="background:#cfc;"
| 2006-01-26 || Win ||align=left| Léo Crepel || Muaythai Gala, Class D Fight || France || Decision || 3 || 
|-  style="background:#cfc;"
| 2005-06-04 || Win ||align=left| Tony Dervillier || Muay Thaï Fury 2, Educatif Fight || Bordeaux, France ||  ||  || 
|-
| colspan=9 | Legend:

See also
List of male kickboxers

References

Living people
French male kickboxers
Welterweight kickboxers
French Muay Thai practitioners
French expatriate sportspeople in Thailand
1990 births